The Bit Player is a 2019 documentary film created to celebrate the 2016 centenary of the birth of Claude Shannon, the "father of information theory".  The film was produced and directed by Mark Levinson, in cooperation with the IEEE Information Theory Society and the IEEE Foundation.

The film premiered at the World Science Festival in New York City on May 29, and was screened for a large audience at the IEEE Information Theory Society's meeting in Vail, Colorado, on June 19.

A review in Physics Today calls it "not quite a documentary"  and "a delightful new film".  The film was named "best in show" in Realscreen's MIPTV Picks 2019.

References

External links

Biographical documentary films
2019 films